The 2013 Ivy League men's soccer season will be the 59th season of men's college soccer in the conference. The league will be part of the 2013 NCAA Division I men's soccer season. The Cornell Big Red are the defending champions.

Teams

Stadia and location

Personnel

References 

 
2013 NCAA Division I men's soccer season